Catharine, formerly known as Burgess Junction, is an unincorporated community in Serena Township, LaSalle County, Illinois, United States. Burgess Junction was named for a Chicago, Burlington and Quincy Railroad attorney. Its name was changed to Catharine in 1968 by the CB&Q at the request of Ellis Waller who proposed to Catharine (Katie) Bentley there on May 23, 1968 during a fund raising railroad excursion that Ellis had arranged. 

Ellis asked the railroad to rename Burgess in honor of Catharine and the railroad agreed. A surprise reception was held on a CB&Q private car in Union Station where Catharine was presented with the metal sign that would be erected at the junction.

References

Unincorporated communities in LaSalle County, Illinois
Unincorporated communities in Illinois